Jules Huyvaert (3 January 1896 – 27 January 1960) was a Belgian racing cyclist. He rode in the 1924 Tour de France.

References

1896 births
1960 deaths
Belgian male cyclists
Place of birth missing